John Chew (25 November 1915 – 5 April 1984) was an English footballer who played at full-back for Luton Town and Port Vale shortly after World War II.

Career
Chew played for Luton Town, before joining Port Vale in March 1946. He made his debut at The Old Recreation Ground in a 4–1 win over Notts County on 23 September, but only had two short spells in the first team, finishing with nine Third Division South and three FA Cup appearances before being released by manager Gordon Hodgson at the end of the season.

Career statistics
Source:

References

1915 births
1984 deaths
People from Longton, Staffordshire
Footballers from Stoke-on-Trent
English footballers
Association football fullbacks
Luton Town F.C. players
Port Vale F.C. players
English Football League players